Sekhemre Seusertawy Sobekhotep VIII was possibly the third king of the 16th Dynasty of Egypt reigning over the Theban region in Upper Egypt during the Second Intermediate Period. Alternatively, he may be a ruler of the 13th or 17th Dynasty. If he was a king of the 16th Dynasty, Sobekhotep VIII would be credited 16 years of reign by the Turin canon, starting c. 1650 BC, at the time of the Hyksos invasion of Egypt.



Chronological position
The 2nd line of the 11th column of the Turin canon reads Sekhem[...]re and refers, according to Egyptologists Kim Ryholt and Darrell Baker, to Sekhemre Seusertawy, which is Sobekhotep VIII's nomen. If this identification is correct, then Sobekhotep VIII reigned for 16 years as the third king of the 16th Dynasty. This would make him the direct successor of Djehuti and the predecessor to Neferhotep III, although his relation to both of these kings remains unknown. In his reconstruction of the chronology of the Second Intermediate Period, Ryholt proposes that Sobekhotep VIII reigned from 1645 BC until 1629 BC, shortly after the Hyksos 15th Dynasty took over the Nile Delta and the city of Memphis, thereby precipitating the collapse of the 13th Dynasty.

In older studies by Egyptologists Jürgen von Beckerath and Labib Habachi, Sobekhotep VIII was considered to be a king of the 13th Dynasty.

Attestation
The only contemporary attestation of Sobekhotep VIII is a stela found inside the third pylon at Karnak. This stela was used as construction material to fill the pylon during Amenhotep III's extensive works at the site. The stela is dated to the epagomenal, or final five days, of Sobekhotep VIII's fourth regnal year, and describes his attitude at a temple, probably that of Karnak, during a massive Nile flood: 

According to Egyptologist John Baines, who studied the stela in detail, by coming to the temple as it was flooded, the king reenacted the Egyptian story of the creation of the world in imitating the actions of the creator god Amun-Ra, to which the stela iconography closely associates the king, ordering the waters to recede from around the primordial mount.

References

17th-century BC Pharaohs
Pharaohs of the Sixteenth Dynasty of Egypt
Pharaohs of the Thirteenth Dynasty of Egypt
Pharaohs of the Seventeenth Dynasty of Egypt